SYF may refer to:
Singapore Youth Festival, a biennial event in Singapore
South Yorkshire Fencing, the organizing body for the sport of fencing in South Yorkshire
Synchrony Financial (NYSE: SYF), an American consumer financial services company